This is a list of notable Indian Bengali scientists.

A
Abhijit Mukherjee
Abhik Ghosh
Aditi Sen De
Ajoy Ghatak
Alok Krishna Gupta
Amal Kumar Raychaudhuri
Amar Bose
Amar Gupta
Ambarish Ghosh
Amiya Charan Banerjee
Amitabha Mukhopadhyay
Amitava Datta
Amitava Raychaudhuri
Anadish Pal
 Anil Kumar Bhattacharyya
Anil Kumar Das
Anil Kumar Mandal
Animesh Chakravorty
Aninda Sinha
Anirban Basu
Anirvan Ghosh
Archana Bhattacharyya
Arnab Rai Choudhuri
Arun Kumar Sharma
Asok Kumar Barua
Ashoke Sen
Asoke Nath Mitra
Asima Chatterjee

B
Basanti Dulal Nagchaudhuri
Basiswar Sen
Basudeb DasSarma
Bibha Chowdhuri
Bidyut Baran Chaudhuri
Bidyendu Mohan Deb
 Bikas Chakrabarti
Biman Bagchi
Biraj Mohan Das Gupta
Birendra Bijoy Biswas
Biswa Ranjan Nag
 Biswarup Mukhopadhyaya
Bhupati Mohan Sen

C
Chitra Dutta
Chitra Mandal
 Chanchal Kumar Majumdar
 Charusita Chakravarty
 Chinmoy Sankar Dey

D
Deb Shankar Ray
Debabrata Goswami
 Debasish Ghose
Debendra Mohan Bose
Dibyendu Nandi
Dilip Mahalanabis
 Dipan Ghosh
Dipankar Chatterji

G
Girindrasekhar Bose
Gopal Chandra Bhattacharya

H
Harinath De
Hassan Suhrawardy
Hiralal Chaudhuri
Hiranmay Sen Gupta

I 
Ipsita Biswas
Indira Chakravarty
Indira Nath
 Indrani Bose
Indumadhab Mallick

J
Jamini Bhushan Ray
 Jagdish Chandra Bose
Jayanta Bandyopadhyay
 Jitendra Nath Goswami
 Jnan Chandra Ghosh

K
K.C. Das
K. S. Dasgupta
Kamanio Chattopadhyay
Kamrun Nahar
Kanny Lall Dey
Kaushik Basu
Kshitindra Mohan Chakravarty
Kshitindramohan Naha
Kishori Mohan Bandyopadhyay

L
Lilabati Bhattacharjee
Lotika Sarkar

M
Madhusudan Gupta
Maharani Chakravorty
Maitree Bhattacharyya
 Manilal Bhaumik
Manju Ray
 Manindra Agrawal
Manoj Majee
Meenakshi Banerjee
Meghnad Saha
Mihir Chowdhury
Mihir Kumar Bose
 Mitali Mukerji
Mrinal Datta Chaudhuri
Monita Chatterjee
Moumita Dutta

N
N. C. Paul
N. G. Majumdar
Nandini Mukherjee
Nandita Basu
Narendra Karmarkar
Nibir Mandal
Nilratan Sircar

P
Palash Sarkar
Partha Sarathi Mukherjee
Pinaki Majumdar
Polly Roy
Prabha Chatterji
Prabodh Chandra Sengupta
Pradyut Ghosh
 Prafulla Chandra Ray
Pran Ranjan Sengupta
Prasanta Chandra Mahalanobis
 Probir Roy
Pulak Sengupta
 Purnima Sinha
Purushottam Chakraborty

R
 Radhanath Sikdar 
Rajdeep Dasgupta
Rajeshwari Chatterjee
 Ram Chet Chaudhary
Ramendra Kumar Podder
 Ranajit Chakraborty
Ranjan Mallik
Rupamanjari Ghosh

S
 S. A. Hussain
S. C. Dutta Roy
S. M. Ullah
Samir Das
Sampa Das
 Sankar K. Pal
Samarendra Nath Biswas
 Samaresh Bhattacharya
 Sanghamitra Bandyopadhyay
Santanu Bose
Santanu Chaudhuri
Sarit Kumar Das
 Sasanka Chandra Bhattacharyya
 Satya Churn Law
 Satyendra Nath Bose
Senjuti Saha
Shantanu Chowdhury
 Sharmila Bhattacharya
Shehla Pervin
 Shipra Guha-Mukherjee
Shireen Akhter
Siddhartha Mukherjee
Snehasikta Swarnakar
 Sisir Kumar Mitra
 Siva Brata Bhattacherjee
 Somak Raychaudhury
Somnath Dasgupta
Souvik Maiti
 Srikumar Banerjee
 Subhash Mukhopadhyay
Subir Kumar Ghosh
Subrata Adak
 Subrata Roy
Sudeshna Sinha
Sudhansu Datta Majumdar
 Sudipta Sengupta
 Sujoy K. Guha
Suman Kumar Dhar
Sunetra Gupta
Sunil Kumar Manna
Suniti Devi
Sunny Sanwar
 Surajit Chandra Sinha
Surya Ganguli
 Sushanta Kumar Dattagupta
 Susmita Bose
 Suvendra Nath Bhattacharyya
 Swapan Chattopadhyay
Swapan K. Gayen

T
Tamal Dey
Tanusri Saha-Dasgupta
Tapas Kumar Kundu
Tista Bagchi

U
Ujjwal Maulik
Usha Ranjan Ghatak

See also

 List of Indians
 Lists of scientists
List of Indian scientists

Bengali
Indian